Taranaki is a region in the North Island of New Zealand. It contains numerous rural primary schools, some small town primary and secondary schools, and city schools in the New Plymouth area. Area schools in isolated areas provide complete education from primary to secondary level. Intermediate schools exist in New Plymouth, Waitara, and Hawera.

All schools are coeducational except for the boys' schools of Francis Douglas Memorial College and New Plymouth Boys' High School and the girls' schools of New Plymouth Girls' High School, Sacred Heart Girls' College, and Taranaki Diocesan School for Girls.

There are two Kura Kaupapa Māori schools in the South Taranaki District, and one in New Plymouth. These schools teach solely or principally in the Māori language. The name "Te Kura Kaupapa Maori o (placename)" can be translated as "The Kaupapa Maori School of (placename)".

In New Zealand schools, students begin formal education in Year 1 at the age of five. Year 13 is the final year of secondary education. Years 14 and 15 refer to adult education facilities.

State schools are those fully funded by the government and at which no fees can be charged to domestic student (i.e. New Zealand citizens and permanent residents, and Australian citizens), although a donation is commonly requested. A state integrated school is a state school with a special character based on a religious or philosophical belief. A private school charges fees to its students.

The Socio-Economic Decile is a widely used measure in education in New Zealand used to allocate funding and support. A rating of 1 indicates a poor area; a rating of 10 a well-off one. The decile ratings used here come from the Ministry of Education Te Kete Ipurangi website and from the decile change spreadsheet listed in the references. The deciles were last revised using information from the 2006 Census. The roll of each school changes frequently as students start school for the first time, move between schools, and graduate. The Ministry of Education institution number, given in the last column, links to the Education Counts page for each school.

New Plymouth District
The New Plymouth District covers the northern area of Taranaki, including the city of New Plymouth and the towns of Ōkato, Waitara and Inglewood.

Stratford District
Stratford District covers the area to the east of Mount Taranaki/Egmont. Part of the district is in the Manawatū-Whanganui Region. The only substantial town is Stratford.

South Taranaki District
The South Taranaki District covers the area to the south of Mount Taranaki. The principal towns are Hāwera, Ōpunake, and Patea.

References
General
Te Kete Ipurangi Ministry of Education website
ERO school and early childhood education reports Education Review Office
Decile change 2007 to 2008 for state & state integrated schools

Specific

 
Taranaki